Tom Strala (born 1 April 1974) is a Swiss architect, designer and artist, known for his raw furniture and lighting designs. In 2005, Strala was awarded 2nd place of the European Luminary of the Year for the TMS 360 Series, a honeycomb structured light shade. His work is included in several exhibitions in museums and universities. Strala is known as design pioneer in marrying art and design.

Life and career
Strala was born as Thomas Michael Schmid  in Schaffhausen, Switzerland on April 1, 1974. He received his Master of Architecture degree in 2001 from the Swiss Federal Institute of Technology (ETHZ) in Zurich, Switzerland and was granted a scholarship for excellence from the Erich Degen Foundation for his master thesis.

Strala was the jury president for the first Innovation and Design Award (ida) in Zurich, Switzerland in 2007 and was a jury member for the Zepter International Design Award in 2013.

Selected design work
Strala avoids industrial and mass production. He designs furniture as an object of utility that does not have to act like a consumer good.

Chaos (2016), steel standing lamp, powder coated

Animal Farm NO. 2 (2011–2015), brass and concrete standing lamp
Animal Farm NO. 1 (2011–2014), brass wall lamp
Lazy Seefelder (2013), chaise longue, nature rattan, chrome steel
Rocking Seefelder (2011–2013), rocking chair, nature rattan, chrome steel
Seefelder (2011–2013), nature rattan chair, chrome steel
Schweini die Origamisau (2012), copper object
Ponte (2012), oak table, white glass
Calmares 1 & 2 (2010), aluminum ceiling lamp, white coated
Comic 1 & 2 (2009), concrete standing lamp, epoxy
Pompidu 2 (2008), aluminum standing lamp, black coated
Pompidu 1 (2008), aluminum wall lamp, black coated
Bartok (2007), concrete, armouring steel table

Nelumbo (2007), plexiglas wall lamp, satined
Strala Table (2006), brown oak oiled table
Kalahario (2005), aluminum chair, black coated, leather
Kalahari (2005), steel chair, black coated, gas spring, leather
INCH (2005), steel standing lamp, black coated
Kalahock (2005), stool, ottoman, aluminium black coated, leather
TMS 360S (2001–2004), chrome steel standing lamp, white coated, browned steel
TMS 90 (2001–2004), chrome steel corner lamp, white coated
TMS 360K (2001–2004), chrome steel ceiling lamp, white coated

TMS 180 (2001–2004), chrome steel wall lamp, white coated
TMS 360G (2001–2004), chrome steel ceiling lamp, white coated

Selected exhibitions
 2016 Radicality of Banality, Exhibition Galerie P!, Pierre Jeanneret vs Tom Strala, Zürich
2015 London Design Festival, 19th Greekstreet, London, UK
2015 BRAND NEW WORLD, Salone del Mobile Milano, Italy
2015 Design & Art exhibition, FOG, San Francisco, USA
2014 Exhibition Art Basel / Design Miami, USA
2014 Curated exhibition Dizajn-Park, Belgrad Serbien
2014 Solo exhibition, Instituto Svizzero di Milano, Italy
2014 Design & Art exhibition, FOG, San Francisco, USA
Since 2013 Design exhibition, The New Black, San Francisco – Design Gallery
2011 Design exhibition, ICFF, New York City
2002 Group exhibition, Landschaftsarchitekturausstellung, Hamburg, Germany
2002 Group exhibition, Architekturfoyer ETH, Zurich, Switzerland

Talks
 2016 Bridging Culture at the HSG Alumni Conference in Davos, Switzerland
 2016 Workshop & talk at FHNW (Fachhochschule Nord-westschweiz), Basel, Switzerland
 2014 Miami Ironside: Materialized Intelligence at Art Basel / Design Miami, USA
 2014 The Leading Creative Minds of the 21st Century with Massimilian Fuksas, Idis Turato and Christian Kerez at Belgrade Design Week in Belgrade, Serbia
 2013 Guest lecturer at the California College of the Arts, CCA, San Francisco, USA

Awards and recognition
 2015 Yatzer: Best of Milano Design Week for Bartok and Frankenstein Chair
 2013 AD Choice – architectural digest, best of architecture and interiors: selected as one of the best 500 furnitures
 2005 Award European Luminary of the Year for the TMS 360 S (2nd place)
 2001 Award Erich Degen Foundation

References

External links
 Official Tom Strala website
 Tom Strala on Designlexikon
 Tom Strala on artsy
 Tom Strala on artnet

Swiss artists
Swiss designers
Swiss architects
1974 births
Living people